Kingston College is a all-male secondary school located in Kingston, Jamaica. It occupies two campuses: The Melbourne Park campus on Upper Elletson road and the larger North Street (Clovelly Park) campus. Some 1900 students are enrolled. The school is noted for its strong academic and sports tradition. It also boasts a world class boys’ choir, the Kingston College Chapel Choir that has given concerts across the island and around the world.

History 
Kingston College was founded in 1925 by Bishop of Jamaica, Dr. G.F.C. DeCarteret with Bishop Percival Gibson as the first headmaster. The school was envisioned as a remedy for the social deformity in which poor black boys were allowed primary education only. The school, Kingston College, was created primarily to provide poor black boys, who otherwise would not have the opportunity, with a secondary education. The founder was convinced that there was a treasury of untapped talent among the black working and lower middle classes. Kingston College would nurture that talent and so take to another level the uncompleted process of full Emancipation that begun in 1838. K.C., as the school became known, admitted any boy, black or not, born in wedlock or not, who could satisfy the entrance requirements and pay the affordable fees.

Kingston College began at 114 ¾ East (corner of East St. and North St.) The school was declared open on April 16, 1925, with forty-nine students. Today the school is located at 2A North Street, Kingston. In 1963 the Melbourne Campus (13 Upper Elleston Road, Kingston C.S.O.) was purchased from the Melbourne Cricket Club. The Melbourne Campus is now home to 7th, 8th, 9th Grade (1st, 2nd and 3rd Form).

The school's color, purple was chosen because it is the color worn by Christian Bishops, the color used by the Greeks to honor their Olympic champions and the color of the leading Empire in History – Rome.

The color purple ties to kings and queens date back to ancient world, where it was prized for its bold hues and often reserved for the upper crust..

Motto 
The school's motto is in Latin: Fortis Cadere Cedere Non Potest, which translates to The Brave May Fall But Never Yield.

Crest 
The crest bears the colors purple and white which represents the Episcopal colours. Purple was the colour of the Roman Empire and was used by the Greeks to honour their Olympic heroes. The pineapple symbolizes the field of labor and fruitfulness, The dog, the animal of loyalty, fidelity and watchfulness. The book represents the Bible and academics.

Rhodes Scholars 
Rhodes Scholars from the college include:

 John Luce Ramson, 1934
 L. L. Murad, 1937
 Evan Astley Morris, 1949
 Delroy Chuck, 1973
 Stephen Vasciannie, 1978

Athletic and academic championships 
The college has won a number of athletic and academic championships in Jamaica.

Track and field
 Boys Champs - 33

Education/general knowledge 
 School's Challenge Quiz - 11

Cricket 
 Sunlight Cup - 23
 Spalding Cup - 9
 Tappin Cup - 6
 Geddes Cup - 3
 Minor Cup - 3
 JIIC - 1

Football
 Manning Cup - 15
 Oliver Shield - 9
 Walker Cup - 9
 Rugby League
U16 - 2

Hockey
 Henriques Shield - 6

Tennis
 Gibson Cup - 14
 Alexander Cup - 4
 JA. Mutual Shield - 3
 Interscholastic Cup - 1

Basketball
 Schools KO Comp. - 16
 Senior League - 15
 Junior Div. - 10
 Junior KO - 8

Swimming
 Simpson Shield - 4

Table tennis
 Kelall Cup - 23
 Burger Cup - 16

Lacrosse
Taino Cup - 2

Notable alumni

Politics and law 
 Stephen Vasciannie, law professor, Jamaica Ambassador to the United States
 Delroy Chuck, lawyer, journalist and politician; Member of Parliament (MP) for the constituency of Saint Andrew North Eastern 
 N. Nick Perry, member of the New York State Assembly

Arts and culture 
 Barrington Watson, Jamaican master painter
 Basil Watson, Jamaican sculptor and painter
 Orlando Patterson, historical and cultural sociologist
 Paul Campbell, film actor 
 Donovan Germain, music producer, founder and head of Penthouse Records
 Lloyd Lovindeer, Jamaican song writer and singer

Military 
 Vincent R. Stewart, Lieutenant General US Marine Corps, Director of the Defense Intelligence Agency

Sports 
 Lennox Miller, Olympic silver and bronze medalist
 Akeem Bloomfield, World Athletics Championships silver medalist
 Michael Holding, former West Indies Cricket Team player
 Marlon Samuels, former West Indies Cricket Team player
 Robert Samuels, former West Indies Cricket Team player
 Allan Cole, former football player and manager of Bob Marley and The Wailers
 Omar McLeod, 110m hurdle Olympic and World champion
 Clive Barriffe, 400 metres hurdles and the 4×400 metres relay athlete
 Romario Williams, footballer
Hansle Parchment, 110m hurdle Olympic Champion

References

External links
 Official website

Schools in Jamaica